Narowal District  (Punjabi and ), is a district in the province of Punjab of Pakistan. Narowal city is the capital of the district. During the British rule, Narowal was the town of Raya Khas tehsil of Sialkot District. Narowal District formed in 1991, when the two tehsils of Narowal and Shakargarh were split off from Sialkot District.

Administration
The district is administratively divided into the following three tehsils (subdivisions), which contain a total of 74 Union Councils:

Geography

The district is bounded by on the northwest by Sialkot, by India on the north by Kathua district of Jammu and Kashmir, on the southeast by the Gurdaspur district and  Pathankot district, on the south by Amritsar district, and on the southwest by Sheikhupura district in Pakistan.

The total area of the district is approximately 4,623 square kilometres. Prior to the creation of Zafarwal Tehsil in July 2009, Narowal Tehsil occupied 1,065 square kilometres while the remaining area (1,272 square kilometres) fell in Shakargarh Tehsil. According to the 1998 census of Pakistan, Narowal District's population was 1,256,097, of which only 12.11% were urbans. According to the 2017 census, total population of District Narowal is 1.709 million. Male population is 0.853 m (49.96%) and Female population is 0.855 m (50.04%).

Demography
According to the 2017 census, the population was 1,707,575 of which 1,450,918 (84.97%) was rural and 256,657 (15.03%) was urban. Muslims made up 97.42% of the population while Christians were 2.22% of the population.

Language 
At the time of the 2017 census, 97.24% of the population spoke Punjabi and 1.66% Urdu as their first language.

Religion

Notable people
 

Dev Anand, Bollywood actor, director & producer
Daniyal Aziz, State Minister of Broadcasting 
Shiv Kumar Batalvi, Punjabi poet
Anwar Aziz Chaudhry, politician
Ijaz Ahmed Chaudhry, justice
Faiz Ahmad Faiz, Pakistani revolutionary poet.
Abrar-ul-Haq, singer-songwriter, philanthropist, politician
Syed Saeed ul Hassan, Minister of Punjab for Auqaf and Religious Affairs
Adnan Ilyas, cricketer 
Ahsan Iqbal, Interior Minister of Pakistan
Chaudhry Muhammad Sarwar Khan, longest serving Parliamentarian in the history of Pakistan.
Rajendra Kumar, film actor, director, producer, recipient of Padma Shri (1969)
Naseer Ahmad Malhi, one of the founding fathers of Pakistan and the first education minister of Pakistan
Chaudhry Abdul Rahim, politician
Des Raj, cricket umpire
Afzal Ahsan Randhawa, writer
Gurbachan Singh Salaria, Indian Army Officer
Kidar Sharma, Indian film director, producer, screenwriter, and Lyricist of Hindi films.
Z. A. Suleri, political journalist

References

External links
  Tehsils & Unions in the District of Narowal - Government of Pakistan
 Profile of Narowal District

 
Districts of Punjab, Pakistan